Sustainability is a peer-reviewed open-access academic journal published by MDPI. It covers all aspects of sustainability studies. The journal has faced criticism over its quality. In September 2021 the journal was among the initial 13 journals included in the official Norwegian list of possibly predatory journals, known as level X. In 2022 the Norwegian national publication committee and Finnish Publication Forum determined that Sustainability is not an academic journal and removed it from the register of approved journals starting from 2023. The journal is listed in the Directory of Open Access Journals.

Abstracting and indexing
This journal is abstracted and indexed in:

According to the Journal Citation Reports, the journal has a 2021 impact factor of 3.889.

References

External links 

Open access journals
Publications established in 2009
MDPI academic journals
Monthly journals
English-language journals